Vijayawada division may refer to:

Vijayawada revenue division
Vijayawada railway division